Volker Bruch (born 9 March 1980) is a German television and film actor. He is best known internationally for his leading roles as Wilhelm Winter in the television drama Generation War (2013) and as Inspector Gereon Rath in the neo-noir series Babylon Berlin (2017–present); for the latter, he was awarded the 2018 Grimme-Preis, Germany's most prestigious television award. In film, he was part of the ensemble cast of two films nominated for Academy Awards in 2009: The Reader (Best Picture) and The Baader Meinhof Complex (Best Foreign Language Film); more recently, he appeared in the thriller The Girl in the Spider's Web (2018).

Early life
Bruch was born in 1980 in West Germany to a German father and Austrian mother. He grew up in Munich with five siblings. He began acting during his years at gymnasium and was involved with student acting groups. After completing his university-entrance diploma, he studied performing arts at the Max Reinhardt Seminar in Vienna, Austria. Bruch made a deliberate choice while studying to commit himself to acting for television and film, as opposed to theater. During this time, he made some of his first television appearances. He graduated in 2005.

Career 
Bruch spent the beginning of his career primarily playing small roles in German television and TV movie productions. His first noteworthy role was as Axi in the 2005 German television movie Rose, for which he won a German Television Award for Best Supporting Actor. The year 2008 was notable for Bruch's career as he acted in a number of movies including the French film Female Agents, the English-language German biopic The Red Baron as Oberleutnant Lothar Freiherr von Richthofen, the Oscar-nominated German film The Baader Meinhof Complex as Stefan Aust, as well as the Oscar-winning American film The Reader.

Bruch had a few small supporting roles after this period before his breakout role in the popular 2013 German miniseries Generation War in which he played one of the five protagonists. Bruch was nominated for a German Television Award for his performance and received a special award for Ensemble Cast at the 2013 Bavarian TV Awards.

After Generation War, Bruch starred in a variety of film and television productions of varying scopes until 2016 when he was cast in Babylon Berlin. In Babylon Berlin, Bruch stars as the main character, police inspector Gereon Rath, who investigates a series of crimes in Weimar Republic-era Berlin. The first two series of the show were filmed over eight months beginning in May 2016 and released consecutively in the fall of 2017. Babylon Berlin has been very popular in Germany as well as with international audiences and has elevated Bruch to international prominence; Bruch is considered one of Germany's upcoming stars. For his portrayal, Bruch received a 2018 Golden Camera Award and shares an Adolf Grimme Award with the Babylon Berlin team.

The show went on a yearlong production hiatus during which Bruch filmed two movies; in 2018, he played a role in the wide-release American film The Girl in the Spider's Web and filmed the German production Rocca Changes the World. In late 2018, Bruch began the six-month shoot for the third series of Babylon Berlin which premiered in Germany in January 2020. A fourth series starring Bruch was produced mid-2021 and was released in 2022.

In 2022, he was cast as German rally driver Walter Röhrl in the English-language film 2 Win. Starring opposite Daniel Brühl and Riccardo Scamarcio, the film depicts the 1983 World Rally Championship.

Personal life 
Bruch lives in Berlin with his partner, actress Miriam Stein. They had a child together in 2017. Bruch met Stein in 2009 on the set of the film Young Goethe in Love. Notably, they later starred together in 2013's Generation War, 2014's Tour de Force, and 2015's Das goldene Ufer.

Bruch speaks English fluently, and has acted in English.

Advocacy 
Bruch is an environmentalist and, with his partner Stein, has supported the climate action group Extinction Rebellion as well as the Joint Declaration made by the German government and media industry "for the sustainable production of films and television series."

In 2019, Bruch, along with other German actors and artists like Daniel Brühl, signed a petition advocating against the election of a far-right Alternative for Germany mayoral candidate in Görlitz, Germany, an oft-used filming location in Europe. 

In June 2020, Bruch took part in the video "Was sie mitgenommen haben" for the United Nations High Commissioner For Refugees (UNHCR).

Bruch is a vocal opponent of the restrictions introduced in to curb the spread of COVID-19 in Germany. In May 2021, it was reported that Bruch had applied to join the Grassroots Democratic Party of Germany, an anti-lockdown fringe party.

Filmography

Television

Film

Accolades

References

External links
 

Living people
1980 births
German male film actors
German male television actors
German people of Austrian descent
People from Munich